Usinsk (Uskar) is a town in the Komi Republic, Russia, located  east of the republic's capital city of Syktyvkar and  north of the town of Pechora, on the northern bank of the Usa River,  before its confluence with the Pechora River. Population:

History
Usinsk was founded in 1966 as a settlement at the newly discovered deposits of petroleum in the north of the Komi Republic. Town status was granted to it in 1984.

Administrative and municipal status
Within the framework of administrative divisions, together with the urban-type settlement of Parma and eighteen rural localities, incorporated as the town of republic significance of Usinsk—It is an administrative unit with the status equal to that of the districts. As a municipal division, the town of republic significance of Usinsk is incorporated as Usinsk Urban Okrug.

Economy
The town is the center for the production of oil and gas in the Komi Republic. Three quarters of all the oil produced in the republic comes from the fields in the territory around Usinsk.

References

Notes

Sources

External links
Official website of Usinsk 
Usinsk. History. Nature 

Cities and towns in the Komi Republic